Joe Hardstaff may refer to:

 Joe Hardstaff Sr (1882–1947), Nottinghamshire and England cricketer
 Joe Hardstaff Jr (1911–1990), Nottinghamshire and England cricketer, son of Joe Hardstaff senior
 Joe Hardstaff (RAF officer) (1935–2022), English Air Commodore and first-class cricketer, son of Joe Hardstaff junior